Kong Linghui (born October 18, 1975) is a male Chinese table tennis player. He competed in the 1996 Summer Olympics, as well as in the 2000 Summer Olympics and the 2004 Summer Olympics.

In 1996, Kong won the gold medal in the men's doubles competition together with Liu Guoliang. Four years later, he won the gold medal in the men's singles competition and the silver medal in the doubles event again together with Liu Guoliang. This made him the third player to achieve a career grand slam of singles championship wins in three majors (Olympics, World Cup, World Championships). He is considered by many to be the most complete player of all time.

In 2004, Kong was eliminated in the third round of the Men's Doubles Competition together with his new partner Wang Hao.

Kong's style was believed to be modeled on the top European players of the late 1980s through to the late 1990s, namely the Swedes Jan Ove Waldner and Jörgen Persson, who won the World Championships in Dortmund in 1989 and Chiba in 1991 respectively.  They utilised the shakehand grip, and played consistent good all-round games characterised by playing close to mid distance from the table, equal on both backhand and forehand sides and being strong in both attack and containing - both players have excellent receive of service techniques and solid blocking games.

In China's attempt to shake the early 1990s European male dominance of the sport - where players such as Saive (Belgium), Primorac (Croatia), Gatien (France), Waldner, Persson and Appelgren (Sweden), and Rosskopf (Germany) were dominating proceedings internationally, they sent the young Kong to Sweden in an unprecedented move to learn the European style of play. He arrived back in China in 1993, and within three years, was ranked world No. 1 as of December 1995.

Kong is considered one of the all-time greats of table tennis and has now taken up position as Head Coach of China's National Women's Team.

Controversy
In May 2017, Kong is being sued by Marina Bay Sands in Singapore, for failing to repay fully a sum of S$1 million, which he borrowed from the hotel's casino in February 2015, according to High Court of the Hong Kong Special Administrative Region. The court writ said, Kong signed a credit agreement to borrow S$1 million from the operator. He had since repaid S$545,625, but failed to offset the balance in full, leaving S$454,375 unpaid. After this event, Kong responded on Weibo, that he was in Singapore with his parents, family and friends. He had sat and observed gambling, helped them collect some gambling chips and leave a relevant personal message at the hotel casino. The Chinese Table Tennis Association said Kong's coaching of the national women's table tennis team post was suspended, and ordered him to return from the World Table Tennis Championships in Germany, as it investigates the allegations.

See also
 List of table tennis players

References

External links
 
 
 

1975 births
Living people
Olympic gold medalists for China
Olympic silver medalists for China
Olympic table tennis players of China
Table tennis players from Harbin
Table tennis players at the 1996 Summer Olympics
Table tennis players at the 2000 Summer Olympics
Table tennis players at the 2004 Summer Olympics
Olympic medalists in table tennis
Asian Games medalists in table tennis
Table tennis players at the 1994 Asian Games
Table tennis players at the 1998 Asian Games
Table tennis players at the 2002 Asian Games
Asian Games gold medalists for China
Asian Games bronze medalists for China
Medalists at the 1994 Asian Games
Medalists at the 1998 Asian Games
Medalists at the 2002 Asian Games
Chinese male table tennis players
Chinese table tennis coaches
Medalists at the 1996 Summer Olympics
Medalists at the 2000 Summer Olympics
20th-century Chinese people
21st-century Chinese people